AviaAM Leasing is a global aviation holding company engaged in the business of commercial aircraft acquisition, leasing and sales. The company has its offices in Vilnius, Lithuania; Zhengzhou (Henan Province), China; Limassol, Cyprus; Dublin, Ireland, Hong Kong and Dubai, UAE.

History  
Avia Asset Management AB was founded in February 2007, by Avia Solutions Group, an international, previously publicly traded aviation holding company with almost 100 offices and production facilities worldwide  In the autumn of 2011, Avia Asset Management AB together with related companies formed an aviation holding company AviaAM Leasing. In June 2013, AviaAM Leasing launched an Initial public offering on the Warsaw Stock Exchange (WSE). In 2018, the company shares were delisted from Warsaw Stock Exchange.

In May 2016, AviaAM Leasing formed a joint venture aircraft leasing company with Henan Civil Aviation Investment Company (HNCA) called AviaAM Financial Leasing China.

In 2018, in March, AviaAM Financial Leasing China, a joint venture between AviaAM Leasing and Henan Civil Aviation Development and Investment Company (HNCA), delivered 3 more Airbus A320 family planes to the Russian airline Aeroflot.

In August of 2020, AviaAM Leasing entered cargo business by acquiring Boeing 747-400F nose-loader. 

In February of 2022, AviaAM Financial Leasing China requested Russian air carriers to ground and redeliver all thirteen aircraft following the sanctions against Russia due to the 2022 Russian Invasion of Ukraine.

In October of 2022, AviaAM Leasing was announced as the launch customer of Mammoth Freighters, a Boeing Licensee for the Boeing 777, for brand new 777-300ERMF freighter conversion.

Business activities 
AviaAM Leasing‘s operations cover aircraft leasing and trading operations working mainly with commercial, charter airlines, ACMI, etc. Working closely with financial institutions – banks, hedge funds, etc. – AviaAM Leasing taps into international financing opportunities for aircraft leasing and trading operations. The company also supports business with aircraft finance consulting services.

Aircraft fleet
AviaAM Leasing has a fleet of regional, narrow-body and wide-body aircraft. These include Airbus A320, Airbus A321, Boeing 737-300, Boeing 737-800, Boeing 747-400F, Boeing 777-300ER and Bombardier CRJ200 aircraft.

References

External links 
AviaAM Leasing official website 

Aircraft leasing companies
Companies based in Vilnius
Companies listed on the Warsaw Stock Exchange
Lithuanian companies established in 2007
Transport companies of Lithuania